Tazeh Kand-e Yaft (also Romanized as Tāzeh Kand-e Yāft; also known as Tāzeh Kand-e Chāy and Tāzeh Kand) is a village in Dodangeh Rural District, Hurand District, Ahar County, East Azerbaijan Province, Iran. At the 2006 census, its population was 26, in 8 families.

References 

Tageo

Populated places in Ahar County